Boyle Street is a neighbourhood located in central Edmonton, Alberta, Canada, immediately east of the downtown core. The neighbourhood is bounded by Grierson Hill to Rowland Road until Alex Taylor Road and then Jasper Avenue east until 82 Street by the south, 82 Street by the east, 97 Street by the west, and the LRT tracks to the north, with Jasper Avenue and 103A Avenue running through the neighbourhood.

The area is ethnically diverse, with a large Chinese community (14.7% of the population in 2001), and Aboriginal descent (4.0% North American Indian, 1.2% Métis, 0.2% Inuit in 2001).

The community is represented by the Boyle Street Community League, established in 1946.

History 

Boyle Street is one of the oldest parts of the city, and is named for lawyer John Robert Boyle.

The origin of the name 'Boyle Street' lies in the original street layouts of the area. Prior to the adoption of the grid system, the district had its avenues running north–south and its streets running east–west (which contrasts with the modern road system in Edmonton). Boyle Street was an east–west throughway which roughly corresponds with the modern 103A Avenue.

Boyle Street was originally the downtown of Edmonton, when the current downtown was under the Hudson's Bay Reserve Lands.  Later, land was sold by Hudson's Bay Company, and development occurred on the modern downtown.

Boyle Street has some of the highest concentrations of old buildings in Edmonton.

Many of the buildings in the area were destroyed during the 1970s, largely as the city removed old and derelict housing and redeveloped the area.

According to the 2001 Federal Census, 42.3% of the occupied private dwellings in Boyle Street were constructed during the 1970s, with a further 14.8% constructed during the following decade. The 2005 Municipal Census reports that 80% of the 3,486 dwelling units in the neighbourhood are apartment style dwellings with a further 15% being rooming houses or collective residences.

Many sites left vacant by demolition during the 1970s were never redeveloped, leaving the area with a patchwork of vacant lots, parking lots and historic buildings. Most of the buildings that escaped demolition were spared because of their Edwardian structures or because they had been previously designated as heritage buildings.

One of the more distinctive municipal historic resource sites in the Boyle Street area is the Gibson Block, a "rare example of a commercial building following the 1902 prototype of a flat iron building, so named for its distinctive triangular shape."

Demographics 

Ethnic diversity 
Boyle Street is an ethnically diverse neighbourhood. According to the 2001 Federal Census, there were 5,930 people living in the neighbourhood, with 46.7% of the population identifying themselves with a specific ethnic group (including Canadian). The most common ethnic groups, with their percentage of the total Boyle Street population were:

 14.7% Chinese
 8.2% Canadian
 5.4% Aboriginal (including North American Indian, Métis and Inuit)
 3.1% English
 2.9% Ukrainian
 2.2% Irish
 2.1% German

Future development 
In 2006, the City of Edmonton began holding public consultations for what it deemed "The Quarters Downtown". The project's aims were to transform a large part of the Boyle Street Community (officially the borders of 'The Quarters Downtown' were defined as being from 97 Street in the west to 92 Street in the east, and from the river valley in the south to 103A Avenue in the north).

This plan saw the area divided into four quarters. The Heritage Quarter would consist of a stretch of Jasper Avenue between 97 Street and 96 Street, which held a large number of historical structures. The Civic Quarter would lie immediately to the north of the Heritage Quarter, and would consist of the area adjacent to the Law Courts, which are located immediately across 97 Street from the Civic Quarter. The other two quarters would be largely residential, a low density McCauley Quarter (so named because it borders on the neighbourhood of McCauley) would lie in the north-east of the district, while the Five Corners Quarter (so named because it centres on the intersection of Jasper Avenue, Harbin Road (102 Avenue) and 95 Street, which has five corners) would be a higher density residential quarter.

See also 
 Edmonton Federation of Community Leagues
 Boyle Street Education Centre

References

External links 
 Boyle Street Community Profile including 2001 Census Data.
 Downtown East Project
 Boyle Street McCauley Area Redevelopment Plan Consolidation (14 MB)
 Edmonton Designated Municipal Historic Resource Sites
 Hecla Block
 Gibson Block
 Pendennis Hotel
 Ernest Brown Block/Brighton Block
 Goodridge Building
 Kingston Powell Building

Neighbourhoods in Edmonton